The Senegal national basketball team (French: Équipe de basketball du Senegal) represents Senegal in men's international basketball and it is overseen by Federation Senegalaise de basketball, five time a gold medallist (in 1968, 1972, 1978, 1980, and 1997), a six time silver medallist, and a four time bronze medallist at the FIBA Africa Championship. Senegal was the first Sub-Saharan African team to qualify for the Summer Olympics Basketball Tournament.

The team has included several players who have competed in the U.S. National Basketball Association, including former Charlotte Bobcats center DeSagana Diop and current Minnesota Timberwolves center Gorgui Dieng, and is considered to be, along with those of Nigeria and Angola, a top African side.

History
Senegal's international participation debuted at the 1968 Summer Olympics. They would have a dominating performance on the African continent at times in the years to follow. Senegal has had many world-elite basketball players, especially at the center position, which helped the team to compete at many major international tournaments. At times, however, the team was overly dependent on its NBA-players. An example was in the mid-2000s, when it struggled with injuries. Having finished as the runner-up to Angola in the 2005 FIBA Africa Championship, Senegal qualified for play in the 2006 FIBA World Championship, where the squad finished last in Group D and twenty-second among the twenty-four sides to have contested the championship, having lost to the United States, Italy, Slovenia, China, and Puerto Rico.

Performance table

Olympic Games

FIBA World Cup

FIBA Africa Championship

African Games

1965 – 
1973 – 4th
1978 – 
1987 – 
1991 – 
1999 – 5th
2003 –

Team

Current roster
Rroster for the AfroBasket 2021.

Depth chart

Notable players

Other current notable players from Senegal:

Famous former players
 DeSagana Diop

Head coach position
  Abdourahmane N'Diaye – 2005
  Sam Vincent – 2007
  Parfaito Adjivon – 2009
  Abdourahmane N'Diaye – 2009–10
  Alain Weisz – 2011
  Cheikh Sarr – 2012–2015
  Porfirio Fisac – 2016–2017
 Moustapha Gaye – 2019–2020
  Boniface N'Dong – 2020–present

Past rosters
1968 Olympic Games: finished 15th among 16 teams

Cheikh Fall, Moussa Sene, Alioune Gueye, Babacar Dia, Papa Diop, Mousse N'Diaye, Babacar Traore, Claude Sadio, Claude Constantino, Babacar Seck, Mansour Diagne, Doudou Camara (Coach: Alioune Diop)

1972 Olympic Games: finished 15th among 16 teams

Cheikh Fall, Babacar Traore, Mohamadou Diop, Babacar Seck, Papa Diop, Alioune Gueye, Pierre Sagna, Abdourahmane N'Diaye, Sylvestre Lopis, Assane Thiam, Joseph Diandy, Doudou Camara (Coach: Amadou Diaw)

1978 World Championship: finished 14th among 14 teams

Mathieu Faye, Bireyma Sadi Diagne, Madiagne N'Diaye, A.Diouf, B.Kaba, J.Lopez, M.Diagne, M.Gueye, J.Toupane, A.Diop, A.Dogue, L.Diop (Coach: I.Diagne)

1980 Olympic Games: finished 11th among 12 teams

Mathieu Faye, Madiagne N'Diaye, Mohamadou Diop, Oumar Dia, Mamadou Diop, Bassirou Badji, Yamar Samb, Bireyma Sadi Diagne, Yaya Cissokho, Modou Tall, Moussa M'Bengue, Hadrame N'Diaye (Coach: Ibrahima Diagne)

1998 World Championship: finished 15th among 16 teams

Makhtar N'Diaye, Mamadou Diouf, Mamadou N'Diaye, Cheikh Yaya Dia, Raymond Carvalho, Mouhamadou Sow, Assane N'Diaye, Boubacar Aw, Kader Malik Fall, Vincent Da Sylva, Samba Aly Ngone Niang, Omer Ba (Coach: Ousseynou Ndiaga Diop)

2006 World Championship: finished 22nd among 24 teams

Makhtar N'Diaye, Babacar Cisse, Mamadou Diouf, Sitapha Savane, Malick Badiane, Mamadou N'Diaye, El Kabir Pene, Pape Ibrahim Faye, Mouhamadou Niang, Souleymane Aw, N'Dongo N'Diaye, Meleye N'Doye (Coach: Moustapha Gaye)

2014 World Championship: finished 16th among 24 teams

Team for the 2015 AfroBasket:

Kit

Manufacturer
2015 – Nike

Sponsor
2015 – Orange

See also
Senegal national under-19 basketball team
Senegal national under-17 basketball team
Senegal national 3x3 team
Senegal women's national basketball team

References

External links
FIBA profile
Senegal Basketball Records at FIBA Archive

Videos
Senegal – Tournament Highlights – 2014 FIBA Basketball World Cup Youtube.com video

Senegal
Senegal national basketball team
Basketball
Basketball in Senegal
1962 establishments in Senegal